{{DISPLAYTITLE:Phi4 Ceti}}

Phi4 Ceti is a solitary, orange-hued star in the equatorial constellation Cetus. It is faintly visible to the naked eye with an apparent visual magnitude of 5.61. At that distance, the visual magnitude of the star is diminished by an extinction factor of 0.10 due to interstellar dust, giving it an absolute magnitude of 0.70. It is drifting closer with a radial velocity of −19 km/s.

This is an evolved G-type giant star with a stellar classification of G8 III. At the estimated age of 1.5 billion years, is a red clump giant on the horizontal branch, which indicates it is generating energy through helium fusion at its core. The star has about 1.76 times the mass of the Sun and has expanded to 11 times the Sun's radius. It is radiating 60 times the solar luminosity from its photosphere at an effective temperature of 4,903 K.

References

G-type giants
Horizontal-branch stars
Cetus (constellation)
Ceti, Phi4
BD-12 0173
Ceti, 23
005722
004587
0279